Tesco has expanded its operations from the United Kingdom to 11 other countries.  Tesco pulled out of the United States in 2013, but continues to see growth elsewhere. Tesco's international expansion strategy has responded to the need to be sensitive to local expectations in other countries by entering into joint ventures with local partners, such as Samsung Group in South Korea (Samsung-Tesco Home plus), and Charoen Pokphand in Thailand (Tesco Lotus), appointing a very high proportion of local personnel to management positions. It also makes small acquisitions as part of its strategy: for example, in its 2005/2006 financial year it made acquisitions in South Korea, one in Poland and one in Japan.

In late 2004 the amount of floorspace Tesco operated outside the UK surpassed the amount it had in its home market for the first time, although the UK still accounted for more than 75% of group revenue due to lower sales per unit area outside the UK.

Overview of operations
The following table shows the number of stores, total store size in area and sales for Tesco's international operations.

Former operations

Europe

Czech Republic  

Tesco opened its first store in the Czech Republic in 1996 and now has over 300 stores, with further planned. Tesco opened its first stores in the Czech Republic by buying Kmart's operations in the country and converting them into Tesco stores. Tesco is also keen to expand non-food items and has already opened petrol stations and offers personal finance services in the Czech Republic. There are currently nine Tesco Extra stores in the Czech Republic – three in Prague, two in Plzeň, and one in Brno, Mladá Boleslav, Trutnov and Ostrava.

By 2012 the company had 322 stores in the Czech Republic. It is one of the market leaders in the Czech Republic.

France 
Tesco owned a French food retailer called Catteau between 1993 and 1997, which operated a chain of 92 stores in NE France under the Cedico, Hyper Cedico and Cedimarche banners. Tesco also operated a "Vin Plus" outlet in Calais, selling wine, beer and spirits, which closed on 30 August 2010, due to decline of the booze cruise.

Hungary 

Tesco launched in Hungary in 1994 (November 23) after purchasing a small local supermarket group trading as S-Market based in Szombathely, in the west of Hungary. It opened its first hypermarket in Hungary at the Polus Centre in Budapest in 1996. Tesco operates through more than 200 stores in Hungary with further openings planned. Tesco Hungary also offers a clothing line and personal finance services. In August 2010 opened the first Tesco Extra in Budapest; its name is Tesco Extra Fogarasi and it is located in Zugló, Budapest. The second Tesco Extra opened in Debrecen in 2012.

Poland 

Tesco entered the Polish market in 1995 acquiring the Polish supermarket chains Minor, Madex and Savia. Tesco  opened its first hypermarket in Wrocław Bielany in 1998. At the height of its operations in Poland the company operated from over 450 various format stores as well as an online shopping service. Tesco Poland offered a broad range of brands on the Polish market including its own branded line of products as well as regional produce, petrol, personal finance services and photo processing. In August 2008 Tesco opened the first Extra store in Poland located in Częstochowa. In November 2019, having suffered years of net losses and despite extensive cost-cutting and attempts at streamlining of its business model, Tesco announced its intent to sell all of its operations in Poland. In 2020 Tesco Poland was bought by Salling Group. Last remaining stores are set to close down on October 28, 2021.

Slovakia 

Tesco Slovakia in 1996 as part of Tesco's international expansion aims. It now operates from 123 stores. Tesco Slovakia has recently put great emphasis on organic products. However, Tesco Slovakia caused controversy amongst the Slovak government when it was found to have come foul of food safety laws in 2006. In April 2010 the first Tesco Extra in Central Europe opened in Bratislava – Petržalka, Slovakia as part of a pilot project for Tesco in the region, including the first self-service cash flow in Central Europe. There are currently seven Tesco Extra stores in Slovakia – three in Bratislava and one each in Zvolen, Trnava, Banská Bystrica and Spišská Nová Ves.
 In 2010 first Tesco Express stores were opened in Bratislava with current number of 16 shops. Tesco also operates store called 'My' in Bratislava which accept Clubcard and share some branding, however, most promotions do not apply for My. Tesco in Slovakia operates mobile network "Tesco Mobile" and also petrol stations.

Ireland 

Tesco first operated in the Irish grocery market in the early 1980s, selling its operations there in March 1986. Tesco re-entered the Irish market in 1997 after the purchase of Power Supermarkets Ltd. It now operates from 154 stores across Ireland. Like Tesco stores in the UK, these offer a home delivery shopping service available to 80% of the Irish population as well as petrol, mobile telephone, personal finance, flower delivery service and a weight-loss programme. Tesco's loyalty programme, Clubcard, is offered in the country. Tesco had approximately 21% of the Irish grocery market in 2019 and its main competitors are Dunnes Stores and SuperValu.

Tesco Ireland claims to be the largest purchaser of Irish food with an estimated €1.5 billion annually. Tesco Ireland operates a number of Tesco Extra hypermarkets in Ireland, with Clarehall Extra on the Malahide Road being the first to open in 2006.

The country's newspaper of record the Irish Times in April 2011 said that "Increasingly, Ireland is being viewed as a provincial backwater by the parent company – albeit a very profitable little backwater – and all the strategic decisions are being taken in the UK.

In 2008 Tesco opened its first eco store in Tramore, Co. Waterford. It is expected to use 45% less energy than other Tesco supermarkets of similar size.

Spain (including Ibiza), Portugal and Gibraltar 
Tesco supplies six stores to date in Spain (including Ibiza), Portugal and Gibraltar that operate under the name The Food Company. Operations started in 2019 with the first store opening in Puerto de Mazarrón located in the Murcia province of Spain. One other store opened in the Algarve, Portugal in 2019 followed by four more in 2020 in Gibraltar, Ibiza, Mijas (Malaga) and Quesada (Alicante). All 7500 Products stocked by The Food Company originate from Britain.

Asia

China 
Tesco acquired a 50% stake in the Hymall chain, from Ting Hsin in September 2004. In December 2006 it raised its stake to 90% in a £180 million deal. Most of Tesco China's stores are based around Shanghai, but according to Tesco it plans to equip the business to expand more quickly and in different areas.
Tesco has a large store in Weifang, Shandong province, and a further two floor store in Taizhou, Jiangsu province. The Tesco in Taizhou offers imported beers and spirits, some imported wines, and Australian, French, Italian and Dutch cheese products. A Tesco Express in the Shanghai Old Street area is no different from a typical Chinese convenience store in both style and products on display.
Tesco has been increasing its own brand products into the Chinese market as well as introducing the Tesco Express format.

In May 2014 Tesco made a deal with the state-run China Resources Enterprise (CRE) to create a joint venture, combining Tesco's 131 stores in the country with CRE's nearly 3000 outlets.  With Tesco owning 20% of the business and CRE 80% this was now the largest food retailer in China.

In Feb 2020, Tesco announced that it would exit the China market by selling the 20% stake to CRE for £275 million and the transaction would be completed by 28 February 2020.

Hong Kong 
In April 2015, the first U Select by Tesco stores resulting from the Chinese joint venture with China Resources Vanguard opened in Hong Kong.

India 
Tesco has had a limited presence in India with a service centre in Bangalore, and outsourcing. In 2008 Tesco announced their intention to invest an initial £60m ($115m) to open a wholesale cash-and-carry business based in Mumbai with the assistance of the Tata Group. In 2014, the joint venture between Tesco and Tata was confirmed, where investment by the earlier was reportedly 140 million dollars, thus becoming the first foreign supermarket to enter the country. The stores are now operated under the banner Star Bazaar and Star Daily supermarkets.

Japan 
Tesco Japan first began operations in 2003. It was brought about by a buy-out of C Two stores for £139 million in July 2003 and later Fre'c in April 2004. Tesco has adopted an approach that focuses on small corner shops that operate similarly to its Express format, rather than opening hypermarkets. It has also launched its range of software in Japan. In August 2011, Tesco announced that they would be selling off their Japanese stores to ÆON after revealing that only half of the stores in the Greater Tokyo Area were making a profit.  Market share in the country was never above 1 percent.

Malaysia 

Tesco opened its first store in Malaysia in May 2002 with the opening of its first hypermarket in Puchong, Selangor. Tesco Malaysia currently operates 49 Tesco and Tesco Extra stores. Tesco has partnered with local conglomerate Sime Darby Berhad, which holds 30% of the shares.

In 2007, Tesco acquired the Malaysian operation of the wholesaler Makro, which was then rebranded as Tesco Extra and provides products for local retailers. There has been plans to relaunch all its stores in Malaysia to Tesco Extra. Besides giving the store a contemporary design and a brighter look, the new Tesco Extra brand features a shop-in-shop concept with an optic shop, pharmacy, bistro and phone shop.

Tesco Malaysia offers a value range, its own branded range, electronic goods, the loyalty clubcard and clothing. Tesco Malaysia's Clubcard introduced Green Clubcard Points in 2007 making Tesco Malaysia the first Tesco international business to introduce the Green Clubcard Points scheme.

In April 2013, Tesco Malaysia launched the Grocery Home Shopping Service, where it delivers groceries ordered via the Internet to consumers, with no minimum purchase imposed. There will be a RM10 service charge for each delivery and online customers may choose a delivery time slot from 10 am to 10 pm daily. Payment is made via credit or debit card. The service is currently offered to customers living within the 20 km radius of Tesco Extra outlets. The Malaysian operation of Tesco also includes a convenience store, Tesco Pernama Ekspres, which began operation in February 2015.

In 2020, Tesco agreed to sell its Malaysian business to the Thailand-based, Charoen Pokphand Group for US$10.6bn, including debt, a transaction that would be expected to be completed in the second half of 2020. With this sale having been completed, Tesco has now changed its name to Lotus's.

Pakistan 

On 16 February 2017 Tesco announced a wholesale partnership with Limestone Private Limited, owner of the Alpha Superstores chain. This involved an exclusive partnership which would see Tesco products stocked across Alpha Supermarket stores within Pakistan.

It was planned in 2017 to open 50 smaller express stores and three larger flagship stores under the Alpha brand name, within 3 years, which will stock Tesco products.

South Korea 

Tesco launched its South Korean operations as "Homeplus" in 1999 and partnered with Samsung, currently Tesco holds 94% of the shares in the venture. It operates both hypermarkets and its express format as well as a home delivery shopping service. It is the second largest retailer in South Korea, just behind Shinsegae Group.

On 14 May 2008, Tesco agreed to purchase 36 hypermarkets with a combination of food and non-food products from E-Land for $1.9 billion (£976 million) in its biggest single acquisition, making Tesco the second largest in the country. The majority of the E-Land stores formerly belonged to French retailer Carrefour before 2006 and most of the stores will be converted to Home plus outlets. Tesco's South Korean discount store chain, Home Plus, currently has 66 outlets.

In September 2015 the company was sold to MBK Partners, a South Korean buyout firm, which partnered with a Canadian pension fund and Singapore's Temasek Holdings in a transaction worth 4.2 billion pounds.

Taiwan 
In September 2005 Tesco announced that it was selling its operations in Taiwan to Carrefour and purchasing Carrefour's stores in the Czech Republic and Slovakia. Both companies stated that they were concentrating their efforts in countries where they had strong market positions.

Thailand 

Tesco entered Thailand in 1998 and operates through 380 stores as part of a joint venture with Charoen Pokphand and named the operation "Tesco Lotus". This partnership was dissolved in 2003 when Charoen Pokphand sold its shares to Tesco. Tesco Lotus sells a diverse range of products from value food products to electronics to personal finance services. The company is keen to promote its green values and has partnered with the UNEP. Tesco Lotus claims to serve 20 million customers every month and that 97% of its goods are sourced from Thailand.

By March 2013, Thailand operations were generating £3 billion in revenues and were one of the company's largest businesses outside of the UK.

Tesco agreed to sell its Thai business to Charoen Pokphand Group for $10.6bn, including debt. A transaction that would be expected to be completed in the second half of 2020.

With this sale having been completed, Tesco Lotus has now changed its name to Lotus's.

Turkey 
Tesco entered the Turkish market in 2003 and uses the trading name "Tesco Kipa". Tesco remains focused on building infrastructure in Turkey to complete its expansion plans and introduced the Tesco Express format into Turkey in 2006. There are plans to increase the rate of expansion as basic infrastructure is built. The first Tesco Extra in Turkey opened a branch in Izmir, Tesco Kipa Extra Balçova in September 2010. In June 2016, Tesco announced the sale of Tesco Kipa to a local rival, Migros Türk.

United States

Tesco entered the United States grocery market in 2007 through the opening of a new chain of convenience stores, named Fresh & Easy, on the West Coast (Arizona, California and Nevada). The company established its U.S. headquarters in El Segundo, California, and the first store opened in Hemet, California in November 2007, with 100 more planned in the first year; a store opening every two-and-a-half days. Although the planned rate of expansion was not maintained, largely because of the recession, by August 2011 Fresh & Easy operated 182 stores across Arizona, California and Nevada. In April 2013, Tesco put the Fresh & Easy chain on sale, booking losses of £1.2bn. It announced the sale of 150 of the stores in the 200-strong chain to private equity firm Yucaipa Companies in September 2013. The BBC reported that the remaining stores were expected to close. The deal included Tesco loaning the venture £80m and retaining an option to buy back a stake in the business if Yucaipa succeeded in turning around the group's performance. The last Fresh & Easy store closed in 2015.

References

External links

 Tesco UK
 Tesco UK plc
 
 Tescopoly.org—coalition of campaign groups criticising Tesco
 Tesco: An Oral History—a National Life Stories collection of interviews held in the British Library.

International Operations
Clothing retailers of the United Kingdom
Convenience stores
Supermarkets of Northern Ireland
Supermarkets of Poland
Supermarkets of the Czech Republic
Companies based in Hertfordshire
British companies established in 1919
Retail companies established in 1919
1919 establishments in the United Kingdom